Hamza Boubakeur or Hamza Al-Sid-Boubakeur, (born 15 June 1912 in Geryville (then French Algeria) as Aboubakeur ben Hamza ben Kadour – died 4 February 1995 in Paris), was a French politician and Muslim cleric.

He comes from the great Arab Family of the Ouled Sidi Cheikh which fought against the French. He is a descendant of both the fierce warrior Sidi Kaddour Ben Hamza and the great soufi master Sidi Abdelkader Ben Muhammed  known as "Sidi Cheikh".

He was appointed (di)rector of the Great Mosque of Paris by SFIO Prime Minister Guy Mollet in 1957, replacing Si Kaddour Benghabrit, and kept this position until the appointment of Sheikh Abbas Bencheikh el Hocine in 1982. Hamza Boubakeur is the author of a French translation of the Quran. He is also the father of Dalil Boubakeur, since 1992 himself rector of the Great Mosque of Paris.

Hamza Boubakeur was elected as MP of Department of Oasis in the first legislature of the French Fifth Republic from 1958 to 1962 and President of the General Council of this French Algerian Department.

After his death, he was buried in the mausoleum of Sidi Ben Eddine in 1995.

References 

1912 births
1995 deaths
Islam in France
Translators of the Quran into French
20th-century translators
Deputies of the 1st National Assembly of the French Fifth Republic